Hongoeka is a community in the city of Porirua in New Zealand. It is northwest of Plimmerton and adjacent to Hongoeka Bay. It extends from an urupā (cemetery) boundary at the end of Moana Road, to Haukōpua (commonly known as Big Bay). A residential area is situated in Hongoeka Bay itself and takes up flat land and lower hillsides. It is bordered by bush clad hills and farmland, and looks out over a broad sweep of rugged coastline towards Whitireia and Mana Island, and to the South Island beyond.

Writer Patricia Grace lives in the area.

History 
Hongoeka has likely been occupied by Ngāti Toa since the 1820s (possibly since the battle of Waiorua in 1824, which secured Te Rauparaha's position on Kapiti Island). Hongoeka was considered desirable for cultivation and for the abundance of kai moana (seafood) found on nearby shores. According to the Maori Land Court minutes, Te Rauparaha gave the Hongoeka lands to his older brother Watarauhi Nohorua and his wife Miriama Te Wainokenoke and her relatives of Ngāti Haumia hapu of Ngāti Toa. 

The village was visited by missionary Octavius Hadfield in 1839, and by Thomas Bevan in 1844, who wrote that "climbing the long spur from above Plimmerton beneath us on the beach we saw the old-time kaingas (sic) – Hongoeka, Motuhara and Turikawera".

Some Ngāti Toa retreated to Hongoeka after the Wairau Affray. Government Official Clarke reported that on 16 August 1843, Acting Governor Shortland met with Te Rauparaha, Rawiri Puaha and all Ngāti Toa from the Cloudy Bay area at Hongoeka immediately after the incident.

Hongoeka formed part of one of three reserves set aside “for the perpetual benefit of Ngāti Toa” (Porirua Deed 1847) following the Crown’s acquisition of Porirua in 1847.

Hongoeka was gazetted as an official geographic name (locality) on 16 December 2010.

Marae

The suburb features Hongoeka Marae, a meeting place for Ngāti Toa. Its wharenui, Te Heke-mai-raro, opened in 1997.

References 

Suburbs of Porirua
Populated places in the Wellington Region